Foluke Atinuke Gunderson (née Akinradewo; born October 5, 1987) is an indoor volleyball player who plays as a middle blocker for Japanese club Hisamitsu Springs. Born in Canada, she represents the United States internationally.  Gunderson won gold with the national team at the 2010 FIVB World Grand Prix, 2014 World Championship, the Rimini Volleyball Nations League, and the 2020 Tokyo Summer Olympics, silver at the 2012 London Summer Olympics, and bronze at the 2016 Rio Olympic Games. Her 2020 Olympics win allowed her to complete the trifecta of winning an Olympic bronze, silver, and gold medal.

High school and personal life
Gunderson was born in London, Ontario, to Ayoola and Comfort Akinradewo. Her siblings are Folu and Foluso Akinradewo. She holds a tri-citizenship with Canada, Nigeria and the United States, and used to audition for commercials when she was little.

Gunderson attended St. Thomas Aquinas High School in Fort Lauderdale, Florida, where she was a three-year letter winner in volleyball and was also on the basketball and track & field teams. She was an All-American selection in 2003 and 2004 and an all-state selection in 2002, 2003 and 2004. She was named the Florida Dairy Farmers Volleyball Player of the Year in 2005. In addition to volleyball, she was an all-state selection in basketball and was a four-time Florida State Champion in track. She made her US international debut before the start of her freshman year at Stanford.  She helped the US win the 2004 NORCECA Continental Women's Junior Championship, and then was the starting middle blocker on the U.S. Women's Junior National Team at the 2005 FIVB World Championships.

Stanford
Gunderson majored in human biology at Stanford University.

As a freshman in 2005, she was named the Pac-10 Freshman of the Year and the American Volleyball Coaches Association (AVCA) Pacific Region Freshman of the Year. She was named an AVCA Second Team All-American and led the squad in hitting percentage (.397), a mark which ranked third in the Pac-10, 13th in the nation and third for a single-season in school history. In 2006, she was named to the NCAA Final Four All-Tournament Team as she led Stanford to an NCAA Division I runner-up finish to Nebraska. For the year, she was named a First Team All-American by the AVCA and Volleyball Magazine.

In 2007, Gunderson was named the AVCA National Player of the Year and was the Honda Sports Award winner for volleyball. She broke the Pac-10 and Stanford single season hitting percentage record by more than 50 points, as she averaged .499 percentage, a mark that was first in the nation and second since rally-scoring was introduced in 2001. She was named to the Final Four All-Tournament Team as she led Stanford to their second consecutive Division I national runner-up finish to Penn State. As a senior in 2008, Gunderson repeated as the Pac-10 Player of the Year and got her third consecutive Honda Award nomination. She repeated as a First Team All-American and led Stanford to their third consecutive NCAA title match.  She finished her collegiate career with the best career hitting efficiency (.446) of any NCAA Division I player.

Club volleyball 
Gunderson joined Toyota Auto Body Queenseis in October 2010. In the 2010–11 V.Premier League, Gunderson was named the winner of the Spike award. Gunderson won the silver medal in the 2012 FIVB Club World Championship, playing with the Azerbaijani club Rabita Baku.

In 2013 Gunderson's club, Rabita Baku, won the Azerbaijan Super League Championship winning their sixth title in a row. She won the league's Best Spiker award.

International career

2012 
Gunderson competed for Team USA in the 2012 Summer Olympics.  She earned a silver medal for her efforts.

2014
Gunderson was part of the USA national team that won the 2014 World Championship gold medal when the team defeated China 3–1 in the final match.  It was the USA's first-ever gold in any of the three major volleyball tournaments.

2016 
Gunderson was part of the US bronze medal-winning team at the 2016 Olympics.  She started all eight games.  She was named in the 2016 Olympic Games Dream Team at middle blocker.

2021
In May 2021, she was named to the 18-player roster for the FIVB Volleyball Nations League tournament. that will be played May 25-June 24 in Rimini, Italy. It is the only major international competition before the Tokyo Olympics in July.

On June 7, 2021, US National Team head coach Karch Kiraly announced she would be part of the 12-player Olympic roster for the 2020 Summer Olympics in Tokyo.

Awards

Individual
 2010 FIVB World Grand Prix "Most Valuable Player"
 2010 FIVB World Grand Prix "Best Blocker"
 2010–2011 Japanese V.League "Spike Award"
 2012-13 Azerbaijan Super League "Best Spiker"
 2016 Olympic Games "Best Middle Blocker"
 2016 FIVB Club World Championship "Best Middle Blocker"
 2017-2018 Japanese V.League Division 1 "Spike Award"
 2018-2019 Japanese V.League "Best Middle Blocker"
 2018-2019 Japanese V.League "Most Valuable Player"

College
Four-time AVCA All-American (2005, second team; 2006–08, first team)
Three-time Volleyball Magazine first team All-American (2006–08)
Four-time All-Pac-10 team (2005–08)
Two-time NCAA Final Four All-Tournament Team (2006, 2007)
2008 – Volleyball Magazine National co-Player of the Year
2008 – Honda Award nominee
2008 – Pac-10 Player of the Year
2007 – AVCA National Player of the Year
2007 – Pac-10 Player of the Year
2007 – Honda Award winner for volleyball
2007 – NCAA Stanford Regional MVP
2007 – Pac-10 Player of the Week (Oct. 1)
2006 – Honda Award nominee
2005 – AVCA Pacific Region Freshman of the Year
2005 – Pac-10 Freshman of the Year

National team
 2010  Pan-American Volleyball Cup 
 2010  FIVB World Grand Prix
 2011  Pan-American Volleyball Cup 
 2011  Women's NORCECA Volleyball Continental Championship
 2011  FIVB World Grand Prix
 2011  FIVB Women's World Cup		
 2012  FIVB World Grand Prix
 2012  Summer Olympics
 2013  FIVB World Grand Champions Cup	
 2013  Women's NORCECA Volleyball Continental Championship
 2014  FIVB World Championship 	
 2015  FIVB World Grand Prix	
 2015  FIVB Women's World Cup
 2015  Women's NORCECA Volleyball Continental Championship
 2016  Women's NORCECA Olympic Qualification Tournament
 2016  FIVB World Grand Prix
 2016  Summer Olympics
 2017  FIVB World Grand Champions Cup	
 2018  FIVB Volleyball Women's Nations League
 2019  FIVB Volleyball Women's Nations League
 2019   FIVB Women's Volleyball Intercontinental Olympic Qualifications Tournament (IOQT) - Qualified
 2019  FIVB Women's World Cup
 2019  Women's NORCECA Volleyball Continental Championship
 2021  FIVB Volleyball Women's Nations League
 2020  2020 Summer Olympics

Clubs
  Toyota Auto Body Queenseis (2010-2011)
  Dinamo Krasnodar (2011–2012)
  Rabita Baku (2012–2015)
  Voléro Zürich (2015–2017)
  Hisamitsu Springs (2017–2019)
  Hisamitsu Springs (2020–2021)

References

Sources
Akinradewo Player Bio at gostanford.com 
Akinradewo on usavolleyball.org

External links
 Foluke Akinradewo at the International Volleyball Federation
 
 
 
 

1987 births
Living people
African-American volleyball players
Black Canadian sportswomen
Canadian women's volleyball players
Nigerian women's volleyball players
Volleyball players at the 2003 Pan American Games
Volleyball players at the 2007 Pan American Games
Volleyball players at the 2012 Summer Olympics
Stanford Cardinal women's volleyball players
Canadian emigrants to the United States
Canadian sportspeople of Nigerian descent
Volleyball people from Ontario
Sportspeople from London, Ontario
Olympic silver medalists for the United States in volleyball
Medalists at the 2012 Summer Olympics
American women's volleyball players
Pan American Games bronze medalists for the United States
Olympic bronze medalists for the United States in volleyball
Medalists at the 2016 Summer Olympics
Volleyball players at the 2016 Summer Olympics
Olympic gold medalists for the United States in volleyball
Medalists at the 2020 Summer Olympics
Volleyball players at the 2020 Summer Olympics
Pan American Games medalists in volleyball
Middle blockers
Medalists at the 2007 Pan American Games
St. Thomas Aquinas High School (Florida) alumni
21st-century African-American sportspeople
21st-century African-American women
20th-century African-American people
20th-century African-American women